Christa Parravani is an author and assistant professor in creative non-fiction at West Virginia University.

Writing
Her first memoir Her was published in 2013. Her second memoir Loved and Wanted: A Memoir of Choice, Children, and Womanhood was published by Henry Holt & Company in October 2020.

Parravani has appeared in Guernica, Catapult, Vogue, The Millions, Salon, The Rumpus, The Daily Beast  and The Washington Post. She has appeared on NPR and PBS.

Photography 
Parravani completed a MFA in photography from Rutgers University and is represented by Foley Gallery in New York.

Personal life
She is married to Anthony Swofford.

Publications
Her: A Memoir. Henry Holt, 2013.
Women in Clothes. Viking; Penguin, 2014.
Loved and Wanted: A Memoir of Choice, Children, and Womanhood. USA: Henry Holt, 2020. UK: Bonnier, 2020.

Awards 

 Residency Fellowship, Corporation of Yaddo 
 Residency Fellowship, Dora Maar House, Brown Fellows Foundation
 Residency Fellowship, MacDowell 
 Amazon Spotlight Debut of the month, March 2013
 Indiebound Next Pick, March 2013
 Salon Best book of 2013
 Wall Street Journal best book of 2013
 Library Journal best book of 2013
 An Oprah, People, and NPR must read book of 2013
 Huffington Post best book of the last 5 years for women, 2015
 Finalist for Books for a Better Life Award, 2013
 Residency Fellowship, Byrdcliffe Center for the Arts
 Mortimer Frank Travel Fellowship, Columbia University

References

External links
 Columbia University Alumni Page of Christa Parravani
 West Virginia University Alumni Page of Christa Parravani

Living people
American writers
American memoirists
American women memoirists
West Virginia University faculty
Year of birth missing (living people)
Writers from Albany, New York
Columbia University alumni
American women academics
21st-century American women